Vasilkino is a rural locality (a village) in Kamensky Selsoviet, Bizhbulyaksky District, Bashkortostan, Russia. The population was 3 as of 2010. There is 1 street.

Geography 
Vasilkino is located 33 km southwest of Bizhbulyak (the district's administrative centre) by road. Progress is the nearest rural locality.

References 

Rural localities in Bizhbulyaksky District